Diamondback (Willis Stryker) is a fictional character appearing in American comic books published by Marvel Comics. He is primarily an enemy of Luke Cage and is notable for being the first major supervillain that he faced.

The character was portrayed by Erik LaRay Harvey in the first season of the Marvel Cinematic Universe television series Luke Cage. This version was the half brother of Luke Cage.

Publication history
Willis Stryker was created by Archie Goodwin and George Tuska and first appeared in Luke Cage, Hero for Hire #1 (June 1972).

After 45 years, Stryker returned to comics in All-New Guardians of the Galaxy: Free Comic Book Day (July 2017).

Fictional character biography
Willis Stryker, one of Luke's childhood friends, first appeared in Luke Cage: Hero for Hire #1. He is known as Diamondback for his mastery of knives, including specially-gimmicked knives that explode, release toxic gases or create sonic waves.

Willis Stryker was born and raised in Harlem, New York City. He grew up on the street alongside Carl Lucas, his best friend and future partner. He was recruited into one of the local gangs, The Rivals. The gang consisted mostly of Carl Lucas, Stryker, Shades and Comanche. They engaged in many gang fights with The Diablos, a rival gang. He also committed petty crimes and worked for a crime lord named Sonny Caputo. Carl changed his life and found an honest job while Willis became a skilled gangster but they remained good friends.

A girl named Reva Connors loved them both but was more attracted to Carl. Willis, devastated by jealousy, framed him by hiding drugs where Carl lived, causing Carl Lucas to be sent to prison. The drugs belonged to the Maggia so they hunted Willis but ended up killing Reva.

Carl changed his name to Luke Cage and escaped from prison thanks to his bulletproof skin and searched for revenge. Luke Cage was attacked by hitmen hired by Diamondback. When the attack failed, Diamondback has his inventor Gadget-Man create new gimmicked switch blades to deal with Cage and kidnapped Claire Temple. Tracking Diamondback to his lair, Luke was surprised to find that it was his old friend Stryker. Diamondback battled Cage who hoped to clear his name. During the fight, Diamondback fell through a skylight and was blown up by one of his own trick switchblades, ruining any hope Luke had that Stryker could clear his name. Just then Claire arrived with Noah Burstein (the man who conducted the prison experiments) and the police, and Luke wonders if Burstein will turn him over to the authorities.

Diamondback later turned up alive. He then began to make plans to become a crime lord where he will start in Harlem and then rule the crime on the Eastern Seaboard. Upon having his men arrange for a meeting with the crime lords at Club Ultimate, Diamondback planned to have waving network of influence. The meeting was crashed by Luke Cage, Iron Fist, and Daredevil. After the fight, Diamondback managed to injure Jessica Jones at her apartment by shooting her. Diamondback later had a meeting with Black Cat which is crashed by Luke Cage. Using toxic dust, Diamondback struck Luke Cage and proceeded to beat him up. Unbeknownst to Diamondback, Black Cat dropped Luke Cage off at Night Nurse's location and she was able to cure him. After recuperation, Luke Cage, Jessica Jones, and their allies went after Diamondback and attacked him at Club Ultimate. Diamondback demonstrated his new abilities like superhuman strength and speed. Although he was injured in the fight, Diamondback got away. During their stakeout of Club Ultimate, Iron Fist and Jessica Jones were ambushed by Diamondback, where he knocked over Jessica Jones' car and broke Iron Fist's back. While gloating over Iron Fist, Diamondback was caught off guard when Jessica Jones attacked him. After being defeated by Jessica Jones and Iron Fist, Diamondback was arrested by the police and transferred to a prison, as he was deemed too dangerous to be placed in the county lockup. He's placed along with the Punisher, who was captured by Daredevil and Luke Cage. During the ride, Diamondback taunts the Punisher, causing the truck to crash and enabling them to escape. He later shows up at Black Cat's apartment, where he shoots her multiple times in retaliation for Cat saving Luke Cage.

While battling a wounded Black Cat, Diamondback is defeated by the Defenders and brought into custody. During the trial, Stryker's lawyer manages to get him out on parole. It's later revealed that the lawyer was hired by Wilson Fisk. He then takes over Club Ultimate, killing Hammerhead in the process. Diamondback later crashes a meeting between Fixer, Moonstone and Titania, where he recruits them to attack the Defenders. When the Defenders arrive at the nightclub to arrest him, Diamondback calls on Fixer, Moonstone and Titania and they begin to fight. In the middle of the fight, Diamondback gets shot by Black Cat and they get captured by the Defenders and their allies.

Diamondback is among the crime lords that compete with Mister Negative to obtain the Tablet of Life and Destiny in order to win the favor of Mayor Wilson Fisk.

Powers and abilities
Willis Stryker is an expert knife fighter and hand-to-hand combatant. Outside of conventional knives, Willis Stryker uses trick knives that were modified by Gadget, where they can emit gas, contain sonic disruptors, and cause explosions.

Following his return from the dead, Diamondback appeared to possess some degree of superhuman strength, being able to throw a person across a room, catch a punch from Jessica Jones and lift her up with one hand, as well as having some degree of superhuman speed. It's later revealed that his super-strength and speed come from consuming drugs.

Other versions

House of M
 In the alternate timeline of the 2005 House of M storyline, the Willis Stryker version of Diamondback is a mutant with reptilian features.

Luke Cage Noir
 Willis Stryker appears in Luke Cage Noir, in which he is a former friend of Luke Cage, and a Harlem crime boss.

In other media

Willis Stryker / Diamondback appears in Luke Cage, portrayed by Erik LaRay Harvey as an adult and Jared Kemp as a teenager. This version is the older half-brother and former best friend of Luke Cage who was born from an affair that Cage's father, Reverend James Lucas, had with his secretary Dana Stryker. As youths, Willis and Cage were arrested for grand theft auto, resulting in the latter joining the Marines while the former served in juvenile detention, later jail, where he was forced to kill in self-defense. This, coupled with Dana being abandoned by Lucas and dying from cancer led to Willis swearing revenge on Cage, who he successfully framed and sent to Seagate Prison. By the present, Willis went on to become an arms dealer, trafficking Hammer Industries weapons to Harlem crime boss Cornell "Cottonmouth" Stokes and his cousin Mariah Dillard. Following a botched arms deal, Stryker sends his associate Hernan "Shades" Alvarez to assist the pair. Upon learning Cage is alive, Willis comes out of hiding and utilizes Judas bullets, exploding hollow-point bullets developed by Hammer Industries from salvaged alien metal that can penetrate Cage's impenetrable skin, in a failed attempt to kill him, though his partnership with Stokes and Dillard falls through and Shades defects to them. Willis dons a Hammer Industries battle-suit and challenges Cage to a street fight, only to be defeated and arrested by Misty Knight.

References

External links
 Diamondback (Willis Stryker) at the Marvel Wiki
 Diamondback (Willis Stryker) at Comic Vine
 

Characters created by Archie Goodwin (comics)
Characters created by George Tuska
Marvel Comics supervillains
Comics characters introduced in 1972
Fictional gangsters
Fictional African-American people
Fictional characters from Manhattan
Fictional knife-fighters
Marvel Comics male supervillains
Marvel Comics characters with superhuman strength
Luke Cage